Jošavica may refer to:

 Jošavica, Croatia, Croatian village near Petrinja
 , Bosnian village near Vukosavlje